Luke Nuttall (born 17 September 2001) is a British Paralympic athlete who competes in the 1500m in the T46 classification.

Athletics career 
Nuttall is based in Charnwood, and began his career competing in county and national-level events. He is coached by his mother, Alison Wyeth. By 2018, he had been selected for GB Paralympics, where aged 17 he won silver in the 2018 World Para Athletics European Championships, finishing second to Bulgaria's Hristiyan Stoyanov. In 2020, he claimed bronze in the 2021 European Para Athletics Championships in Bydgoszcz with a seven-second personal best. Later that summer, he was selected to represent Great Britain at the 2020 Summer Paralympics in the T46 1500m.

Personal life 
Nuttall was born in Preston, Lancashire. He is the son of former British Olympic long-distance runners John Nuttall, and Alison Wyeth, and has an older sister, Hannah Nuttall, who also became a runner. His stepmother and stepsister are Liz McColgan and Eilish McColgan, both of whom have also competed at the Olympics in long distance running.

References 

2001 births
Living people
Sportspeople from Preston, Lancashire
Paralympic athletes of Great Britain
British male middle-distance runners
Athletes (track and field) at the 2020 Summer Paralympics
Medalists at the World Para Athletics European Championships
21st-century British people